Orange Factory Music (also known as OFM) is an American production team formed in 1999 by record producers and songwriters Jeremy "JRemy" Skaller and Robert "Bobby Bass" Larow. OFM also has one writer signed under its corporate umbrella; Jonathan 'Perky Rain' Perkins. Most noted for their discovery and development of Jay Sean, the duo met at the University of Vermont, before moving to New York to pursue their musical career. Skaller and Larow, professionally known as "J Remy" and "Bobby Bass" also continued to produce, write, and remix songs for Fabolous,  Monrose, Eva Avila, Ricki-Lee and  Jay Sean.

The duo first charted with the No. 1 Billboard Dance song "Don't Want Another Man" by Tina Ann. In the next few years OFM consistently charted on the Billboard charts with production, remixer, and writers credits with Britney Spears, Justin Timberlake, Beyoncé, Kelly Rowland, Seal, Usher, Blue Cantrell, Backstreet Boys, Birdman, Alanis Morissette, Janet Jackson, Annie Lennox, Dolce, Tina Ann, Fabolous, Bone Crusher, Shakira, and Jessica Simpson.

In September 2013, OFM writer/composer Jonathan Perkins expanded the company's operations to Nashville in a joint publishing venture with OFM Publishing and Reach Music Publishing. In 2015, Skaller signed singer/actor Kiana Ledé. Since then she has signed a recording deal with Republic Records and a publishing deal with SonyATV.

They have produced, remixed and or written for Jay Sean, Britney Spears, Justin Timberlake, Beyoncé, Seal, Usher, Birdman, Blue Cantrell, Backstreet Boys, Alanis Morissette, Annie Lennox, Fabolous, Janet Jackson, and Shakira. Most recently they produced the No. 1 Aria Chart hit, "Boom Boom", by Justice Crew.

Career

Discography

Remixes

Artists

Jay Sean
OFM discovered British artist Jay Sean and helped to develop his sound, stage show, and story leading to a multi-album, multimillion-dollar record deal with Cash Money Records/Universal Republic. OFM then produced his internationally successful album My Own Way (No. 1 R&B Album on the UK Charts).

OFM produced and co-wrote the five times worldwide Billboard No. 1 single "Down" (Featuring Lil Wayne) as well as the second single, "Do You Remember" (featuring Sean Paul and Lil Jon), peaking at No. 10 on the Hot 100 and rapidly selling over a million units, itself.  These two platinum selling singles charted in the Billboard top 10 and the Billboard hot 100 at the same time, which had not been accomplished by a male artist since 2003. OFM is currently involved with touring, sponsorships, TV appearances, and clothing lines with Jay Sean, as well.

Kiana Ledé 
Kiana Ledé is signed to Republic Records. Her first single is due in early 2017

Thara
Former Desert Storm artist Thara.

Israel
Australian R&B singer, songwriter and producer Israel.

Other Orange Factory Music related ventures

Silverbridge Media 
Silverbridge Media is a music licensing and supervisor company. They have worked with MTV/Viacom on such shows as Room Raiders, Cribs, and Sweet 16. They have scored three mini-movies for Fabolous. In 2010, their writer/producer Jonathan "PerkyRain" Perkins won an Emmy for his documentary scoring work in 2010.

Orange Factory Publishing initiatives 
Orange Factory Music (under the name Orange Factory Repertoire) has a publishing JV with Primary Wave/BMG, for the producer/songwriter, Khaled Rohaim (a member of the production team Twice As Nice).

References

Record producers from Vermont
Musicians from Vermont
Record production teams
Songwriting teams